Crambus saltuellus, the pasture grass-veneer, is a moth in the family Crambidae. It was described by Philipp Christoph Zeller in 1863. It is found in North America, where it has been recorded from the north-eastern United States south to North Carolina. It is also present in southern Ontario.

The wingspan is about 22 mm.

The larvae feed on various grasses.

References

Crambini
Moths described in 1863
Moths of North America